The 1952 French Grand Prix was a Formula Two race held on 6 July 1952 at Rouen-Les-Essarts. It was race 4 of 8 in the 1952 World Championship of Drivers, in which each Grand Prix was run to Formula Two rules rather than the Formula One regulations normally used. Unusually this race was run over a duration of 3 hours, rather than a fixed distance.

Report
Having won the previous weekend's Grand Prix de la Marne, Jean Behra, racing for Equipe Gordini, was among the favourites for the first French Grand Prix to be held at Rouen-Les-Essarts. Also driving for Gordini were regulars Robert Manzon and Prince Bira, alongside Maurice Trintignant, who replaced Johnny Claes from the lineup for the previous round. Claes entered the race in a Simca-Gordini under his own 'Ecurie Belge' label, which he had used in the 1950 and 1951 seasons. Ferrari retained their lineup of Ascari, Farina and Taruffi, who had locked out the front row of the grid in Belgium. There were also several privateer Ferrari entries: the Swiss duo of Rudi Fischer and Peter Hirt, representing Ecurie Espadon, the Italian pairing of Franco Comotti and Piero Carini, for Scuderia Marzotto, and Louis Rosier. HWM again ran regular drivers Lance Macklin and Peter Collins, this time alongside Frenchman Yves Giraud-Cabantous. While the factory Maserati team remained absent, their new car, the A6GCM, made its World Championship debut, driven by Philippe Étancelin of Escuderia Bandeirantes. Enrico Platé entered a pair of older Maseratis, the 4CLT/48 model, for Toulo de Graffenried and Harry Schell. Completing the grid were Peter Whitehead, in a privately run Alta, and Mike Hawthorn, who again took part in a Cooper-Bristol.

Ascari took his second consecutive pole position, with his Ferrari teammates Farina and Taruffi again joining him on the front row of the grid. The Gordini team locked out the second row, with Behra and Manzon qualifying in fourth and fifth, respectively. Their teammates Trintignant and Bira started from the third row, alongside Peter Collins in the fastest of the HWMs. The new Maserati A6GCM proved a disappointment, with Philippe Étancelin only managing to qualify on the seventh row of the grid (out of eight).

The Ferraris once again dominated the race, with Alberto Ascari leading Farina from start to finish, thus taking his second consecutive victory in the World Championship. Despite a good start from the Gordinis of Manzon and Behra, that saw them take third and fourth place, respectively, by the end of the first lap, Piero Taruffi managed to regain third place on lap 4 and subsequently held it for the remainder of the race, ensuring that it was an all-Ferrari podium. Manzon finished fourth, a lap behind Taruffi, while his teammate Maurice Trintignant took the final points-scoring position of fifth. HWM driver Peter Collins took sixth, two laps behind Trintignant, ahead of Jean Behra, for whom seventh represented something of a recovery, having been in last place at the end of lap 3. His race had been compromised when he crashed and consequently needed to pit.

Ascari's win, and fastest lap, ensured that he took a five-point lead in the Drivers' Championship, ahead of fellow Ferrari driver Piero Taruffi. Farina's second consecutive second-place finish took him to third in the standings, one point adrift of Taruffi. Indianapolis 500 winner Troy Ruttman was a further four points behind in fourth, one point ahead of Gordini driver Robert Manzon.

Entries

 — Piero Taruffi qualified and drove the entire race in the #12 Ferrari. Luigi Villoresi, who was also entered in the same car, was unable to participate due to injury.
 — Toulo de Graffenried qualified and drove 26 laps of the race in the #16 Maserati. Harry Schell, whose own vehicle had already retired, took over the car for a further 8 laps before again being forced to retire.
 — Philippe Étancelin qualified and drove the entire race in the #28 Maserati. Eitel Cantoni was also entered in the car, but took no part in the Grand Prix after being fired.
 — Chico Landi withdrew from the event prior to practice.
 — Rudi Fischer qualified and drove 37 laps of the race in the #36 Ferrari. He was initially due to drive the #34 Ferrari 500, but engine problems in practice meant that he instead participated in a 212. Peter Hirt took over the car for the remainder of the race. Rudolf Schoeller, named substitute driver for the car, was not used during the Grand Prix.
 — Vittorio Marzotto, Sergio Sighinolfi and Reg Parnell were the designated substitute drivers for cars #38, #40 and #42, respectively. None of the three was used during the Grand Prix.

Classification

Qualifying

Race

Notes
 – Includes 1 point for fastest lap

Shared drives
 Car #34: Fischer (33 laps) then Hirt (33 laps)
 Car #16: de Graffenried (20 laps) then Schell (14 laps)

Championship standings after the race 
Drivers' Championship standings

Note: Only the top five positions are included. Only the best 4 results counted towards the Championship.

References

French Grand Prix
French Grand Prix
French Grand Prix
French Grand Prix